Humphrey–Parkes terminology is a system of nomenclature for the plumage of birds. Before the Humphrey–Parkes system, plumage was named after the belief that a certain plumage was breeding plumage and others were not. However, as this system did not always work correctly, the new Humphrey–Parkes came into use to rectify this error. This terminology is named after P. S. Humphrey and K. C. Parkes.

Under the Humphrey–Parkes nomenclature, the main adult plumage, especially when it is produced by a complete molt, is called basic plumage. In most birds, the non-breeding plumage, which is worn longer than the breeding plumage, is known as the basic plumage. In birds that molt only once a year, the regular and only plumage is known as basic plumage.

In some birds, a partial molt occurs before the bird breeds. This plumage is known as the alternate plumage and is generally what was previously known as a bird's breeding plumage. If a bird produces a third plumage in addition to the basic and alternative, it is known as supplemental plumage. This plumage is most frequently found in ptarmigans. The unique plumage of a juvenile bird is known as juvenal (or less precisely, juvenile) plumage.

When the bird is molting, the molt is known as a prejuvenal, prebasic, prealternate, or presupplemental molt, depending on which type follows the molt.

For birds that do not completely molt into full adult plumage the first time, a numbering system is used to signify which plumage it is in. For example, for the first time a bird enters basic plumage, the plumage is known as first basic plumage; the second, second basic plumage. The numbers are dropped after a bird achieves its full adult plumage.

References

Birds